The 1997 Pittsburgh Pirates season was the 116th season of the franchise; the 111th in the National League. This was their 28th season at Three Rivers Stadium. The Pirates finished second in the National League Central with a record of 79–83.

Offseason
 November 14, 1996: Dan Plesac, Carlos García and Orlando Merced were traded by the Pirates to the Toronto Blue Jays for José Silva, Brandon Cromer (minors), Jose Pett (minors), and players to be named later. The Blue Jays completed the deal by sending Abraham Núñez, Craig Wilson, and Mike Halperin (minors) to the Pirates on December 11.
 December 13, 1996: Jay Bell and Jeff King were traded by the Pirates to the Kansas City Royals for Jeff Granger, Joe Randa, Jeff Wallace, and Jeff Martin (minors).
 December 20, 1996: Kevin Elster was signed as a free agent with the Pittsburgh Pirates.

New stadium referendum
Perhaps the most interesting headline of the Pirates' 1997 season didn't occur on the field.  In 1997 voters in Pittsburgh's Allegheny County and 10 surrounding counties were presented with a referendum, known as the Regional Renaissance Initiative, to raise their county sales tax by 1/2% for seven years to fund, among other things, new stadiums for the Pirates and Pittsburgh Steelers.  Both teams were playing in Three Rivers Stadium, which at the time was considered by many to be obsolete.  The unexpected pennant drive provided a backdrop for the question as it was debated throughout the summer, given the concern that the Pirates might leave the city if a new stadium wasn't procured.

The referendum failed badly in all 11 counties.  Only in Allegheny County was it close (58-42), while being rejected by 2-1 to 3-1 margins in other counties.  The next year what became known as "Plan B" was pursued by local and state government officials which called again for two new stadiums as well as an expansion of the David L. Lawrence Convention Center.  The new plan was eventually passed, this time without a referendum and despite polls showing the public was against this as well, resulting in the construction of PNC Park and Heinz Field, where both teams would start playing in 2001.

Regular season
The 1997 Pittsburgh Pirates were informally known as "The Freak Show," as the team of rookies and cheap veterans (the team only had a $9 million payroll) unexpectedly competed with the Houston Astros for the division title until the final week of the season.

Season standings

Game log

|- style="background:#cfc;"
| 1 || April 1 || @ Giants || 5–2 || Ruebel (1–0) || Rodriguez || Ericks (1) || 41,996 || 1–0
|- style="background:#fbb;"
| 2 || April 3 || @ Giants || 5–7 || Fernandez || Cooke (0–1) || Beck || 8,099 || 1–1
|- style="background:#fbb;"
| 3 || April 4 || @ Dodgers || 3–5 || Candiotti || Wainhouse (0–1) || Worrell || 37,284 || 1–2
|- style="background:#cfc;"
| 4 || April 5 || @ Dodgers || 3–1 || Cordova (1–0) || Park || Ericks (2) || 41,099 || 2–2
|- style="background:#fbb;"
| 5 || April 6 || @ Dodgers || 3–6 || Dreifort || Rincon (0–1) || Worrell || 37,493 || 2–3
|- style="background:#fbb;"
| 6 || April 7 || @ Padres || 2–3 (10) || Veras || Ruebel (1–1) || — || 29,895 || 2–4
|- style="background:#cfc;"
| 7 || April 8 || @ Padres || 2–0 || Cooke (1–1) || Bergman || Ericks (3) || 14,278 || 3–4
|- style="background:#cfc;"
| 8 || April 9 || @ Padres || 4–2 || Loaiza (1–0) || Worrell || Ericks (4) || 24,735 || 4–4
|- style="background:#fbb;"
| 9 || April 11 || Dodgers || 1–7 || Martinez || Cordova (1–1) || — || 43,126 || 4–5
|- style="background:#fbb;"
| 10 || April 13 || Dodgers || 5–14 || Nomo || Schmidt (0–1) || — || 14,885 || 4–6
|- style="background:#cfc;"
| 11 || April 15 || Padres || 3–2 || Ericks (1–0) || Ashby || — || 6,851 || 5–6
|- style="background:#fbb;"
| 12 || April 16 || Padres || 5–7 || Valenzuela || Cooke (1–2) || Hoffman || 6,777 || 5–7
|- style="background:#cfc;"
| 13 || April 17 || Reds || 3–2 || Loaiza (2–0) || Morgan || Ericks (5) || 6,039 || 6–7
|- style="background:#fbb;"
| 14 || April 18 || Reds || 1–6 || Burba || Cordova (1–2) || — || 9,082 || 6–8
|- style="background:#cfc;"
| 15 || April 19 || Reds || 6–5 || Rincon (1–1) || Remlinger || — || 11,457 || 7–8
|- style="background:#cfc;"
| 16 || April 20 || Reds || 5–3 || Lieber (1–0) || Mercker || Ericks (6) || 14,542 || 8–8
|- style="background:#fbb;"
| 17 || April 21 || Phillies || 2–10 || Schilling || Cooke (1–3) || — || 9,015 || 8–9
|- style="background:#cfc;"
| 18 || April 23 || Phillies || 3–2 || Rincon (2–1) || Spradlin || — || 8,850 || 9–9
|- style="background:#cfc;"
| 19 || April 24 || @ Cubs || 4–3 || Loiselle (1–0) || Rojas || — || 21,787 || 10–9
|- style="background:#fbb;"
| 20 || April 25 || @ Cubs || 1–11 || Foster || Lieber (1–1) || — || 18,333 || 10–10
|- style="background:#fbb;"
| 21 || April 26 || @ Cubs || 6–7 || Patterson || Rincon (2–2) || Rojas || 29,323 || 10–11
|- style="background:#cfc;"
| 22 || April 27 || @ Cubs || 7–0 || Schmidt (1–1) || Telemaco || — || 21,083 || 11–11
|- style="background:#cfc;"
| 23 || April 28 || @ Phillies || 9–4 (12) || Wilkins (1–0) || Mimbs || — || 12,017 || 12–11
|- style="background:#fbb;"
| 24 || April 29 || @ Phillies || 2–8 || Maduro || Ruebel (1–2) || — || 12,453 || 12–12
|- style="background:#fbb;"
| 25 || April 30 || Giants || 1–6 || Gardner || Lieber (1–2) || — || 10,073 || 12–13
|-

|- style="background:#cfc;"
| 26 || May 1 || Giants || 3–2 || Cooke (2–3) || Estes || Rincon (1) || 10,507 || 13–13
|- style="background:#cfc;"
| 27 || May 2 || @ Braves || 3–2 || Peters (1–0) || Bielecki || Loiselle (1) || 37,577 || 14–13
|- style="background:#cfc;"
| 28 || May 3 || @ Braves || 3–0 || Loaiza (3–0) || Glavine || Rincon (2) || 46,602 || 15–13
|- style="background:#fbb;"
| 29 || May 4 || @ Braves || 1–3 || Wade || Cordova (1–3) || Wohlers || 42,037 || 15–14
|- style="background:#fbb;"
| 30 || May 5 || @ Marlins || 0–3 || Helling || Lieber (1–3) || Nen || 16,616 || 15–15
|- style="background:#cfc;"
| 31 || May 6 || @ Marlins || 4–0 || Cooke (3–3) || Fernandez || — || 18,063 || 16–15
|- style="background:#cfc;"
| 32 || May 7 || @ Rockies || 14–3 || Wilkins (2–0) || Thompson || — || 48,056 || 17–15
|- style="background:#cfc;"
| 33 || May 8 || @ Rockies || 10–8 || Loaiza (4–0) || Wright || Loiselle (2) || 48,050 || 18–15
|- style="background:#cfc;"
| 34 || May 9 || Braves || 9–0 || Cordova (2–3) || Wade || — || 18,006 || 19–15
|- style="background:#fbb;"
| 35 || May 10 || Braves || 3–9 || Neagle || Lieber (1–4) || — || 34,143 || 19–16
|- style="background:#fbb;"
| 36 || May 11 || Braves || 2–8 || Smoltz || Cooke (3–4) || — || 29,895 || 19–17
|- style="background:#fbb;"
| 37 || May 12 || Braves || 2–10 || Maddux || Schmidt (1–2) || — || 12,114 || 19–18
|- style="background:#cfc;"
| 38 || May 14 || Rockies || 15–10 || Wilkins (3–0) || Reed || — || 11,841 || 20–18
|- style="background:#cfc;"
| 39 || May 15 || Rockies || 4–3 || Cordova (3–3) || Bailey || Rincon (3) || 8,548 || 21–18
|- style="background:#fbb;"
| 40 || May 16 || Marlins || 1–3 || Fernandez || Lieber (1–5) || Nen || 17,156 || 21–19
|- style="background:#fbb;"
| 41 || May 17 || Marlins || 1–11 || Rapp || Cooke (3–5) || — || 32,066 || 21–20
|- style="background:#fbb;"
| 42 || May 18 || Marlins || 3–5 (10) || Nen || Loiselle (1–1) || Stanifer || 28,702 || 21–21
|- style="background:#fbb;"
| 43 || May 20 || @ Cardinals || 1–3 || Jackson || Loaiza (4–1) || Eckersley || 25,990 || 21–22
|- style="background:#cfc;"
| 44 || May 21 || @ Cardinals || 3–2 || Ruebel (2–2) || Fossas || Loiselle (3) || 34,738 || 22–22
|- style="background:#cfc;"
| 45 || May 22 || @ Expos || 9–3 || Lieber (2–5) || Perez || Rincon (4) || 12,620 || 23–22
|- style="background:#fbb;"
| 46 || May 23 || @ Expos || 1–4 || Martinez || Cooke (3–6) || — || 18,499 || 23–23
|- style="background:#fbb;"
| 47 || May 24 || @ Expos || 3–7 || Juden || Schmidt (1–3) || Urbina || 26,154 || 23–24
|- style="background:#cfc;"
| 48 || May 25 || @ Expos || 8–6 || Wilkins (4–0) || Daal || Loiselle (4) || 27,253 || 24–24
|- style="background:#fbb;"
| 49 || May 26 || Cubs || 1–2 || Foster || Cordova (3–4) || Adams || 20,609 || 24–25
|- style="background:#fbb;"
| 50 || May 27 || Cubs || 7–8 || Gonzalez || Lieber (2–6) || Adams || 9,641 || 24–26
|- style="background:#cfc;"
| 51 || May 28 || Cubs || 4–1 || Cooke (4–6) || Mulholland || — || 10,198 || 25–26
|- style="background:#cfc;"
| 52 || May 30 || Expos || 10–2 || Peters (2–0) || Juden || — || 14,676 || 26–26
|- style="background:#fbb;"
| 53 || May 31 || Expos || 2–4 || Hermanson || Loaiza (4–2) || Urbina || 14,628 || 26–27
|-

|- style="background:#cfc;"
| 54 || June 1 || Expos || 11–2 || Cordova (4–4) || Bullinger || — || 25,752 || 27–27
|- style="background:#fbb;"
| 55 || June 2 || @ Cubs || 2–3 || Mulholland || Lieber (2–7) || Adams || 21,773 || 27–28
|- style="background:#cfc;"
| 56 || June 3 || @ Cubs || 3–1 || Cooke (5–6) || Trachsel || Loiselle (5) || 17,317 || 28–28
|- style="background:#fbb;"
| 57 || June 4 || Cardinals || 0–10 || Benes || Schmidt (1–4) || — || 19,181 || 28–29
|- style="background:#cfc;"
| 58 || June 5 || Cardinals || 9–3 || Loaiza (5–2) || Stottlemyre || — || 11,382 || 29–29
|- style="background:#cfc;"
| 59 || June 6 || Phillies || 5–4 (10) || Wilkins (5–0) || Spradlin || — || 15,165 || 30–29
|- style="background:#cfc;"
| 60 || June 7 || Phillies || 9–2 || Lieber (3–7) || Nye || — || 25,664 || 31–29
|- style="background:#fbb;"
| 61 || June 8 || Phillies || 2–3 || Schilling || Cooke (5–7) || Bottalico || 30,667 || 31–30
|- style="background:#fbb;"
| 62 || June 10 || @ Reds || 5–8 || Remlinger || Rincon (2–3) || Shaw || 18,556 || 31–31
|- style="background:#fbb;"
| 63 || June 11 || @ Reds || 1–2 || Tomko || Loaiza (5–3) || Shaw || 20,854 || 31–32
|- style="background:#cfc;"
| 64 || June 13 || Royals || 5–3 || Cordova (5–4) || Williams || Loiselle (6) || 33,253 || 32–32
|- style="background:#fbb;"
| 65 || June 14 || Royals || 3–8 || Belcher || Lieber (3–8) || Montgomery || 39,509 || 32–33
|- style="background:#fbb;"
| 66 || June 15 || Royals || 1–8 || Appier || Cooke (5–8) || — || 35,774 || 32–34
|- style="background:#cfc;"
| 67 || June 16 || @ Twins || 8–6 || Schmidt (2–4) || Aldred || Loiselle (7) || 16,007 || 33–34
|- style="background:#fbb;"
| 68 || June 17 || @ Twins || 1–13 || Hawkins || Loaiza (5–4) || — || 14,894 || 33–35
|- style="background:#fbb;"
| 69 || June 18 || @ Twins || 2–8 || Radke || Cordova (5–5) || — || 15,688 || 33–36
|- style="background:#fbb;"
| 70 || June 19 || @ Mets || 6–7 || Franco || Rincon (2–4) || — || 15,492 || 33–37
|- style="background:#fbb;"
| 71 || June 20 || @ Mets || 0–1 || Jones || Cooke (5–9) || Franco || 18,737 || 33–38
|- style="background:#fbb;"
| 72 || June 21 || @ Mets || 2–3 || Mlicki || Wilkins (5–1) || McMichael || 32,908 || 33–39
|- style="background:#fbb;"
| 73 || June 22 || @ Mets || 9–12 (10) || Kashiwada || Peters (2–1) || — || 23,247 || 33–40
|- style="background:#cfc;"
| 74 || June 23 || @ Astros || 6–0 || Cordova (6–5) || Garcia || — || 16,738 || 34–40
|- style="background:#cfc;"
| 75 || June 24 || @ Astros || 8–3 || Lieber (4–8) || Wall || — || 17,972 || 35–40
|- style="background:#fbb;"
| 76 || June 25 || @ Astros || 1–5 || Kile || Sodowsky (0–1) || — || 26,954 || 35–41
|- style="background:#cfc;"
| 77 || June 27 || Mets || 6–1 || Schmidt (3–4) || Mlicki || — || 18,103 || 36–41
|- style="background:#fbb;"
| 78 || June 28 || Mets || 3–8 || Reynoso || Loaiza (5–5) || — || 23,711 || 36–42
|- style="background:#fbb;"
| 79 || June 29 || Mets || 8–10 || Jordan || Peters (2–2) || Franco || 26,499 || 36–43
|- style="background:#cfc;"
| 80 || June 30 || White Sox || 3–1 || Lieber (5–8) || Darwin || — || 28,070 || 37–43
|-

|- style="background:#cfc;"
| 81 || July 1 || White Sox || 3–0 || Cooke (6–9) || Baldwin || Loiselle (8) || 22,163 || 38–43
|- style="background:#cfc;"
| 82 || July 2 || White Sox || 3–1 || Schmidt (4–4) || Navarro || — || 25,772 || 39–43
|- style="background:#cfc;"
| 83 || July 3 || @ Cardinals || 6–4 || Loaiza (6–5) || Valenzuela || Loiselle (9) || 30,753 || 40–43
|- style="background:#cfc;"
| 84 || July 4 || @ Cardinals || 7–5 (10) || Wilkins (6–1) || Eckersley || Loiselle (10) || 33,885 || 41–43
|- style="background:#cfc;"
| 85 || July 5 || @ Cardinals || 4–3 || Lieber (6–8) || Morris || Wilkins (1) || 39,593 || 42–43
|- style="background:#cfc;"
| 86 || July 6 || @ Cardinals || 6–3 || Cooke (7–9) || Stottlemyre || — || 29,290 || 43–43
|- style="background:#fbb;"
| 87 || July 10 || Astros || 0–7 || Kile || Schmidt (4–5) || — || 17,335 || 43–44
|- style="background:#fbb;"
| 88 || July 11 || Astros || 0–10 || Hampton || Loaiza (6–6) || — || 21,913 || 43–45
|- style="background:#cfc;"
| 89 || July 12 || Astros || 3–0 (10) || Rincon (3–4) || Hudek || — || 44,119 || 44–45
|- style="background:#cfc;"
| 90 || July 13 || Astros || 5–3 || Sodowsky (1–1) || Springer || Loiselle (11) || 25,675 || 45–45
|- style="background:#cfc;"
| 91 || July 14 || Mets || 5–4 || Rincon (4–4) || McMichael || Loiselle (12) || 12,794 || 46–45
|- style="background:#cfc;"
| 92 || July 15 || Mets || 4–3 || Christiansen (1–0) || Acevedo || Loiselle (13) || 12,244 || 47–45
|- style="background:#fbb;"
| 93 || July 16 || Reds || 3–7 || Burba || Loaiza (6–7) || — || 30,698 || 47–46
|- style="background:#fbb;"
| 94 || July 17 || Reds || 5–9 || Smiley || Cordova (6–6) || — || 19,710 || 47–47
|- style="background:#fbb;"
| 95 || July 18 || @ Phillies || 6–8 || Leiter || Lieber (6–9) || Bottalico || 19,676 || 47–48
|- style="background:#cfc;"
| 96 || July 19 || @ Phillies || 13–3 || Cooke (8–9) || Green || — || 17,472 || 48–48
|- style="background:#fbb;"
| 97 || July 20 || @ Phillies || 1–4 || Stephenson || Schmidt (4–6) || Bottalico || 20,431 || 48–49
|- style="background:#cfc;"
| 98 || July 21 || @ Phillies || 3–2 || Loaiza (7–7) || Schilling || Loiselle (14) || 19,303 || 49–49
|- style="background:#fbb;"
| 99 || July 22 || @ Padres || 2–3 || Hoffman || Loiselle (1–2) || — || 18,306 || 49–50
|- style="background:#fbb;"
| 100 || July 23 || @ Padres || 1–9 || Smith || Lieber (6–10) || — || 16,151 || 49–51
|- style="background:#fbb;"
| 101 || July 24 || @ Padres || 6–8 || Bruske || Sodowsky (1–2) || Hoffman || 18,715 || 49–52
|- style="background:#cfc;"
| 102 || July 25 || @ Giants || 5–2 || Schmidt (5–6) || Rueter || Loiselle (15) || 14,236 || 50–52
|- style="background:#cfc;"
| 103 || July 26 || @ Giants || 10–3 || Loaiza (8–7) || Creek || — || 25,962 || 51–52
|- style="background:#fbb;"
| 104 || July 27 || @ Giants || 5–6 (13) || Henry || Wilkins (6–2) || — || 0 || 51–53
|- style="background:#cfc;"
| 105 || July 27 || @ Giants || 10–7 || Cordova (7–6) || VanLandingham || — || 38,866 || 52–53
|- style="background:#fbb;"
| 106 || July 28 || @ Dodgers || 2–4 || Valdez || Lieber (6–11) || Worrell || 53,503 || 52–54
|- style="background:#fbb;"
| 107 || July 29 || @ Dodgers || 1–3 || Astacio || Cooke (8–10) || Worrell || 43,791 || 52–55
|- style="background:#cfc;"
| 108 || July 31 || Rockies || 4–1 || Schmidt (6–6) || Bailey || Loiselle (16) || 16,654 || 53–55
|-

|- style="background:#fbb;"
| 109 || August 1 || Rockies || 6–7 || Reed || Rincon (4–5) || Dipoto || 22,657 || 53–56
|- style="background:#cfc;"
| 110 || August 2 || Rockies || 6–5 || Cordova (8–6) || Swift || Loiselle (17) || 32,388 || 54–56
|- style="background:#cfc;"
| 111 || August 3 || Rockies || 8–4 || Ruebel (3–2) || Reed || — || 24,989 || 55–56
|- style="background:#fbb;"
| 112 || August 4 || Braves || 0–6 || Smoltz || Cooke (8–11) || — || 21,609 || 55–57
|- style="background:#cfc;"
| 113 || August 5 || Braves || 5–4 || Schmidt (7–6) || Glavine || Loiselle (18) || 20,069 || 56–57
|- style="background:#fbb;"
| 114 || August 6 || Marlins || 3–12 || Brown || Loaiza (8–8) || — || 32,594 || 56–58
|- style="background:#cfc;"
| 115 || August 7 || Marlins || 5–1 || Wilkins (7–2) || Leiter || — || 18,042 || 57–58
|- style="background:#fbb;"
| 116 || August 8 || @ Rockies || 3–5 || Wright || Lieber (6–12) || Dipoto || 48,262 || 57–59
|- style="background:#fbb;"
| 117 || August 9 || @ Rockies || 7–8 || Munoz || Rincon (4–6) || — || 48,323 || 57–60
|- style="background:#fbb;"
| 118 || August 10 || @ Rockies || 7–8 || Leskanic || Wilkins (7–3) || Dipoto || 48,018 || 57–61
|- style="background:#cfc;"
| 119 || August 12 || @ Braves || 5–2 || Sodowsky (2–2) || Wohlers || Loiselle (19) || 42,435 || 58–61
|- style="background:#cfc;"
| 120 || August 13 || @ Braves || 2–1 || Lieber (7–12) || Smoltz || Loiselle (20) || 40,793 || 59–61
|- style="background:#fbb;"
| 121 || August 15 || @ Marlins || 5–6 || Powell || Loiselle (1–3) || — || 26,092 || 59–62
|- style="background:#cfc;"
| 122 || August 16 || @ Marlins || 10–5 || Cordova (9–6) || Saunders || — || 40,031 || 60–62
|- style="background:#fbb;"
| 123 || August 17 || @ Marlins || 2–10 || Brown || Cooke (8–12) || — || 38,221 || 60–63
|- style="background:#cfc;"
| 124 || August 18 || @ Marlins || 7–2 || Loaiza (9–8) || Alfonseca || — || 30,200 || 61–63
|- style="background:#cfc;"
| 125 || August 19 || Padres || 5–3 || Lieber (8–12) || Smith || Loiselle (21) || 12,411 || 62–63
|- style="background:#cfc;"
| 126 || August 20 || Padres || 7–3 || Schmidt (8–6) || Ashby || — || 10,222 || 63–63
|- style="background:#fbb;"
| 127 || August 21 || Padres || 4–9 || Hitchcock || Cordova (9–7) || — || 13,129 || 63–64
|- style="background:#cfc;"
| 128 || August 22 || Giants || 3–2 || Cooke (9–12) || Rueter || Loiselle (22) || 18,562 || 64–64
|- style="background:#cfc;"
| 129 || August 23 || Giants || 6–4 || Loaiza (10–8) || Darwin || Loiselle (23) || 42,502 || 65–64
|- style="background:#cfc;"
| 130 || August 24 || Giants || 9–6 || Christiansen (2–0) || Henry || Wilkins (2) || 33,363 || 66–64
|- style="background:#fbb;"
| 131 || August 25 || Dodgers || 2–8 || Martinez || Schmidt (8–7) || Guthrie || 0 || 66–65
|- style="background:#cfc;"
| 132 || August 25 || Dodgers || 4–3 || Wilkins (8–3) || Worrell || — || 14,018 || 67–65
|- style="background:#fbb;"
| 133 || August 26 || Dodgers || 4–6 || Dreifort || Rincon (4–7) || — || 13,689 || 67–66
|- style="background:#fbb;"
| 134 || August 27 || Dodgers || 5–9 || Reyes || Cooke (9–13) || — || 48,032 || 67–67
|- style="background:#fbb;"
| 135 || August 29 || @ Brewers || 1–4 || Karl || Loaiza (10–9) || Jones || 17,539 || 67–68
|- style="background:#cfc;"
| 136 || August 30 || @ Brewers || 3–1 || Lieber (9–12) || Mercedes || Loiselle (24) || 23,673 || 68–68
|- style="background:#fbb;"
| 137 || August 31 || @ Brewers || 2–3 || Jones || Wilkins (8–4) || — || 32,541 || 68–69
|-

|- style="background:#fbb;"
| 138 || September 1 || Indians || 5–7 || Ogea || Cooke (9–14) || Mesa || 45,298 || 68–70
|- style="background:#cfc;"
| 139 || September 2 || Indians || 6–4 || Silva (1–0) || Wright || Loiselle (25) || 43,380 || 69–70
|- style="background:#fbb;"
| 140 || September 3 || Indians || 3–7 || Hershiser || Loaiza (10–10) || — || 37,513 || 69–71
|- style="background:#fbb;"
| 141 || September 4 || @ Reds || 2–5 || Morgan || Lieber (9–13) || Shaw || 15,136 || 69–72
|- style="background:#fbb;"
| 142 || September 5 || @ Reds || 6–8 || Sullivan || Wilkins (8–5) || Shaw || 21,492 || 69–73
|- style="background:#cfc;"
| 143 || September 6 || @ Reds || 13–4 || Cordova (10–7) || Remlinger || — || 20,383 || 70–73
|- style="background:#fbb;"
| 144 || September 7 || @ Reds || 3–6 || Burba || Silva (1–1) || Shaw || 19,682 || 70–74
|- style="background:#fbb;"
| 145 || September 9 || @ Expos || 4–5 (10) || Urbina || Loiselle (1–4) || — || 8,782 || 70–75
|- style="background:#fbb;"
| 146 || September 10 || @ Expos || 4–5 || Martinez || Lieber (9–14) || Urbina || 10,139 || 70–76
|- style="background:#cfc;"
| 147 || September 12 || Cubs || 3–1 || Schmidt (9–7) || Batista || Loiselle (26) || 13,833 || 71–76
|- style="background:#fbb;"
| 148 || September 13 || Cubs || 1–4 || Trachsel || Cordova (10–8) || Adams || 21,505 || 71–77
|- style="background:#fbb;"
| 149 || September 14 || Cubs || 2–3 || Clark || Rincon (4–8) || Adams || 20,120 || 71–78
|- style="background:#cfc;"
| 150 || September 15 || Expos || 5–4 (10) || Wilkins (9–5) || Telford || — || 7,736 || 72–78
|- style="background:#cfc;"
| 151 || September 16 || Expos || 8–2 || Lieber (10–14) || Johnson || — || 8,010 || 73–78
|- style="background:#fbb;"
| 152 || September 17 || Astros || 4–8 || Reynolds || Schmidt (9–8) || — || 27,422 || 73–79
|- style="background:#cfc;"
| 153 || September 18 || Astros || 12–3 || Cordova (11–8) || Kile || — || 14,852 || 74–79
|- style="background:#fbb;"
| 154 || September 19 || Cardinals || 5–6 (11) || King || Loiselle (1–5) || Eckersley || 16,235 || 74–80
|- style="background:#cfc;"
| 155 || September 20 || Cardinals || 10–1 || Loaiza (11–10) || Beltran || — || 21,053 || 75–80
|- style="background:#cfc;"
| 156 || September 21 || Cardinals || 14–2 || Lieber (11–14) || Busby || — || 26,247 || 76–80
|- style="background:#cfc;"
| 157 || September 22 || Cardinals || 3–1 || Schmidt (10–8) || Morris || Loiselle (27) || 17,919 || 77–80
|- style="background:#cfc;"
| 158 || September 23 || @ Mets || 5–4 || Silva (2–1) || Lidle || Loiselle (28) || 14,670 || 78–80
|- style="background:#fbb;"
| 159 || September 24 || @ Mets || 5–7 || Crawford || Cooke (9–15) || Rojas || 13,195 || 78–81
|- style="background:#fbb;"
| 160 || September 26 || @ Astros || 0–2 || Garcia || Loaiza (11–11) || Wagner || 37,850 || 78–82
|- style="background:#fbb;"
| 161 || September 27 || @ Astros || 1–8 || Reynolds || Schmidt (10–9) || — || 36,170 || 78–83
|- style="background:#cfc;"
| 162 || September 28 || @ Astros || 5–4 (11) || Christiansen (3–0) || Henriquez || Loiselle (29) || 30,606 || 79–83
|-

|-
| Legend:       = Win       = LossBold = Pirates team member

Record vs. opponents

Detailed records

Roster

Opening Day lineup

Player stats
Batting
Note: G = Games played; AB = At bats; H = Hits; Avg. = Batting average; HR = Home runs; RBI = Runs batted in

Pitching
Note: G = Games pitched; IP = Innings pitched; W = Wins; L = Losses; ERA = Earned run average; SO = Strikeouts

Awards and honors

The Sporting News Executive of the Year Award
Cam Bonifay, GM

1997 Major League Baseball All-Star Game
Tony Womack, 2B, reserve

Notable transactions
 July 8, 1997: Midre Cummings was selected off waivers from the Pirates by the Philadelphia Phillies.

Farm system

LEAGUE CHAMPIONS: Lynchburg

References

 1997 Pittsburgh Pirates at Baseball Reference
 1997 Pittsburgh Pirates  at Baseball Almanac

Further reading
September 1997 editorial

Pittsburgh Pirates seasons
Pittsburgh Pirates Season, 1997
Pittsburgh Pirates Season, 1997
Pitts